Bašovce is a village and municipality in Piešťany District in the Trnava Region of western Slovakia.

History
In historical records the village was first mentioned in 1113.

Geography
The municipality lies at an altitude of 164 metres and covers an area of 4.044 km². It has a population of about 348 people.

Genealogical resources

The records for genealogical research are available at the state archive "Statny Archiv in Bratislava, Slovakia"

 Roman Catholic church records (births/marriages/deaths): 1765-1949 (parish B)

See also
 List of municipalities and towns in Slovakia

External links

Official Website
Surnames of living people in Basovce

Villages and municipalities in Piešťany District